Harry Allen Haines (born 1939 in Montana) is a judge of the United States Tax Court.

Haines earned his B.A. at St. Olaf College in 1961, his J.D. at the University of Montana Law School in 1964, and an LL.M. in Taxation from New York University Law School in 1966. Following his 1964 admission to the Montana Bar and U.S. District Court, Montana, he practiced law in Missoula, Montana, as a partner in the law firm of Worden, Thane & Haines from 1966 to 2003, also serving as an adjunct professor in the University of Montana Law School from 1967 to 1991. Haines was appointed by President George W. Bush as Judge, United States Tax Court, on April 22, 2003 for a term ending April 21, 2018.

In October 2015, Haines was presented with the Distinguished Service Award at the 63rd Annual Montana Tax Institute for his service to the School of Law, the state of Montana and the nation.

References

External links
 Judge Haines from the United States Tax Court website.
 Judge Haines Bloomberg profile 

1939 births
Living people
People from Missoula, Montana
University of Montana alumni
University of Montana faculty
St. Olaf College alumni
Judges of the United States Tax Court
United States Article I federal judges appointed by George W. Bush